Rákoš is a village and municipality in Košice-okolie District in the Kosice Region of eastern Slovakia.

External links
Rákoš at the Statistical Office of the Slovak Republic

Villages and municipalities in Košice-okolie District